Merited Athlete is an honorary title of North Korea given to sports persons. It is awarded to "athletes and workers engaged in the athletic field who make distinguished contributions to the nation's athletics, receiving the love and respect of the people for devoting themselves to national and social projects". A typical achievement is winning a regional competition in Asia. The title was instituted in November 1960.

, Merited Athletes are paid a 70-won (32-dollar) monthly pension after they retire at age 60, equivalent to an ordinary office worker's pay. Merited Athletes have also been given luxurious apartments. A Merited Athlete may become a sporting coach if they complete a four-year course at the Korean Athletics University.

Recipients
In 2001, the Korean Central News Agency (KCNA) reported that 320 or more people have been awarded either the title of Merited Athlete or the related title of People's Athlete since 1986. , around 200 people in total had receive the title of People's Athlete.

List

See also

 Orders and medals of North Korea
 Sport in North Korea
 The Game of Their Lives (2002 film)

References

Works cited

Further reading

1960 establishments in North Korea
Awards established in 1960
Orders, decorations, and medals of North Korea
Sport in North Korea
Sports trophies and awards
Honorary titles